Silvia Avallone (born 11 April 1984) is an Italian novelist and poet.

Early life
Born in 1984 in Biella, she spent her adolescence in Piombino. She was an only child of divorced parents; her father owned a small business and her mother was a schoolteacher. She studied philosophy and literature in Bologna, and later married a bookseller.

Literary career
Her first collection of poetry, Il libro dei vent'anni, appeared in 2007. She also wrote short stories, which were published in literary magazines. Her first novel, Acciaio, was published in 2010 by RCS MediaGroup. Set in a steel mill in Piombino, it draws heavily on her childhood experiences. The book sold 350,000 copies and was translated into several languages. It won the Premio Campiello and was a finalist for the Strega Prize. In 2012 it was adapted into a film of the same name by Stefano Mordini.

Her second novel, Marina Bellezza, was published in 2013.

In 2018 she published her third novel, Da dove la vita è perfetta, narrating the interwoven histories of two Italian women confronted with the question of motherhood.

Works
 2007: Il libro dei vent'anni (poetry)
 2010: Acciaio (English translation, Swimming to Elba)
 2011: La lince
 2013: Marina Bellezza
 2018: Da dove la vita è perfetta
 2020: Un'amicizia

References

External links
 Official site

1984 births
Italian novelists
Italian poets
Living people